Headlands is a constituency of the National Assembly of the Parliament of Zimbabwe, reportedly the country's largest. Located in Makoni District in Manicaland Province, its current MP since a 2015 by-election is Christopher Chingosho of ZANU–PF.

Profile 
Headlands constituency is located in Makoni District in Manicaland Province, and covers the areas of Anoldine, Chiendambuya, Eagles Nest, Headlands, Inyati, and Monte Casino. As of 2015, it consists of eight wards: 6, 7, 8, 10, 12, 32, 34, and 37. The constituency had 25,806 registered voters in 2008, and a total population of 56,062 in 2012, of which 27,542 were males and 28,520 were females. The main source of livelihood for constituents in Headlands is small-scale farming. It is a tobacco farming area with some timber plantations also located in the constituency.

History 
Headlands was created in 2008 with territory taken from the Makoni North constituency. In the 2008 election, Didymus Mutasa won the seat for ZANU–PF with 7,257 votes, and was reelected in the 2013 election with 10,975 votes. The seat fell vacant in 2015 when Mutasa was expelled from ZANU–PF, and was thus automatically recalled from parliament in accordance with Section 129 (1) (k) of the Constitution of Zimbabwe. A by-election was held on 10 June 2015, which was won by Christopher Chingosho of ZANU–PF. Chingosho was reelected in the 2018 election.

Members

References 

2008 establishments in Zimbabwe
Constituencies established in 2008
Manicaland Province
Parliamentary constituencies in Zimbabwe